James Hovannes Sookias (born 7 May 1999) is an English first-class cricketer.
Born at Solihull in May 1999, Sookias was educated at Repton School, before attending the University of Durham. While studying at Durham, Sookias made his debut in first-class cricket in April 2018 for Durham MCCU against Warwickshire at Edgbaston. Playing as a wicket-keeper, he took three catches in the match. He made his debut in minor counties cricket for Staffordshire in the 2018 Minor Counties Championship.

Sookias made his second appearance in first-class cricket in April 2019 against Durham CCC at the Emirates Riverside.

References

External links
James Sookias at ESPNcricinfo
James Sookias at CricketArchive

1999 births
Living people
People from Solihull
People educated at Repton School
English cricketers
Durham MCCU cricketers
Staffordshire cricketers
Alumni of Collingwood College, Durham